is a town located in Hakui District, Ishikawa Prefecture, Japan. , the town had an estimated population of 13,418 in 4962 households, and a population density of 84 persons per km2. In 2013, the Food and Agriculture Organization recognised Hōdatsushimizu under its Globally Important Agricultural Heritage Systems (GIAHS) programme as a sustainable agricultural model.

Geography
Hōdatsushimizu occupies the southern neck of Noto Peninsula, facing the Sea of Japan to the west and Toyama Prefecture to the east. It is one hour from Kanazawa by train. Mount Hōdatsu, the highest mountain in the Noto Peninsula, is in Hōdatsushimizu. The town has a humid continental climate (Köppen Cfa) characterized by mild summers and cold winters with heavy snowfall.  The average annual temperature in Hōdatsushimizu is 13.3 °C. The average annual rainfall is 2435 mm with September as the wettest month. The temperatures are highest on average in August, at around 25.9 °C, and lowest in January, at around 2.1 °C.

Neighbouring municipalities
Ishikawa Prefecture
Kahoku
Hakui
Tsubata
Toyama Prefecture
Himi
Takaoka

Demographics
Per Japanese census data, the population of Hōdatsushimizu has declined over the past 40 years.

History
The area around Hōdatsushimizu has been settled since the Japanese Paleolithic period, and remnants of Jōmon period and Yayoi period settlements have been found in many areas. The area was part of ancient Noto Province from the Nara period. During the Sengoku Period, the area was contested between the Hatakeyama clan, Uesugi clan and Maeda clan. The Siege of Suemori (1584) occurred in what is now part of the town. The area became part of Kaga Domain under the Edo period Tokugawa shogunate, and was noted for its gold mine  Following the Meiji restoration, the area was organised into Hakui District, Ishikawa.

The modern town of Hōdatsushimizu was formed March 1, 2005 from the merger of the towns of Oshimizu and Shio, and its name i  a compound of former names (Shio + Oshimizu).

Economy
Agriculture is important to the local economy.

Education
Hōdatsushimizu has five public elementary schools and one public middle school operated by the town government, and one public high school operated by the Ishikawa Prefectural Board of Education.

Transportation

Railway
  West Japan Railway Company - Nanao Line
 -  -

Highway

Local attractions
Mount Hōdatsu, Hōdatsu
Chirihama Nagisa Driveway
Sandenkanaya Kofun, National Historic Site

References

External links

 

 
Towns in Ishikawa Prefecture
Populated coastal places in Japan